The Adventure F series is a family of French paramotor designs that was designed and produced by Adventure SA of Méré, Yonne, for powered paragliding.

Design and development
The aircraft series features a paraglider-style high-wing, single-place accommodation and a single engine in pusher configuration. Take-off and landing is accomplished by foot. The series was designed for portability and as a result is of small dimensions and light weight. All versions can be disassembled to be transported in the trunk of an automobile or checked as baggage on an airline flight.

Factory options available included electric starting, a fuel gauge, quieter four-bladed propeller and the capability to carry a second person in tandem.

Variants
F1
The basic model of the line, powered by a  Solo 210 engine. Sold for US$6500 in 2001.
F2
Powered by a  Solo 210 engine, with the  Zenoah G-25 engine optional. Sold for US$7000 in 2001.
F3
Sold for US$7000 in 2001.
F4
Sold for US$7000 in 2001.

Specifications (F1)

See also
Paramotor Inc FX series

References

F
1990s French ultralight aircraft
Single-engined pusher aircraft
Paramotors